Lea-Marie Maureen Tahuhu (born 23 September 1990) is a New Zealand cricketer who plays as a right-arm fast bowler. She made her international debut for the New Zealand women's cricket team in June 2011.

Career
In December 2017, she was named as one of the players in the ICC Women's T20I Team of the Year.

In August 2018, she was awarded a central contract by New Zealand Cricket, following the tours of Ireland and England in the previous months. In October 2018, she was named in New Zealand's squad for the 2018 ICC Women's World Twenty20 tournament in the West Indies. Ahead of the tournament, she was named as one of the players to watch.

In November 2018, she was named in the Melbourne Renegades' squad for the 2018–19 Women's Big Bash League season. In January 2020, she was named in New Zealand's squad for the 2020 ICC Women's T20 World Cup in Australia. In August 2021, she was named in New Zealand's squad for the limited overs series against England which also marked her comeback return to the national side after 18 months since being diagnosed with a mole on her left foot. On 21 September 2021, in the third match against England, Tahuhu took her first five-wicket haul in WODI cricket.

In February 2022, she was named in New Zealand's team for the 2022 Women's Cricket World Cup in New Zealand. In July 2022, Tahuhu was added to New Zealand's team for the cricket tournament at the 2022 Commonwealth Games in Birmingham, England.

Personal life
Tahuhu attended Aranui High School, and won the Peter Hooton Memorial Scholarship in 2008. She is married to fellow international cricketer Amy Satterthwaite. On 13 January 2020, Satterthwaite gave birth to a child and took an extended paid maternity leave.

References

External links 

 
 

1990 births
Living people
New Zealand women cricketers
New Zealand women One Day International cricketers
New Zealand women Twenty20 International cricketers
People educated at Aranui High School
Cricketers from Christchurch
Canterbury Magicians cricketers
ACT Meteors cricketers
Melbourne Renegades (WBBL) cricketers
Sydney Thunder (WBBL) cricketers
Surrey women cricketers
Surrey Stars cricketers
Lancashire Thunder cricketers
Manchester Originals cricketers
IPL Trailblazers cricketers
IPL Supernovas cricketers
LGBT cricketers
New Zealand LGBT sportspeople
Lesbian sportswomen
Cricketers at the 2022 Commonwealth Games
Commonwealth Games bronze medallists for New Zealand
Commonwealth Games medallists in cricket
Expatriate sportspeople in England
Expatriate sportspeople in Australia
Medallists at the 2022 Commonwealth Games